Once Upon a Time in the East is a 1974 Canadian drama film directed by André Brassard. It was entered into the 1974 Cannes Film Festival.

The film is based on several plays by Michel Tremblay, weaving characters from the plays Les Belles-sœurs, Hosanna, La duchesse de Langeais and À toi, pour toujours, ta Marie-Lou into an original ensemble cast story.

Cast
 Denise Filiatrault as Hélène
 Michelle Rossignol as Pierrette
 Frédérique Collin as Lise Paquette
 Sophie Clément as Carmen
 André Montmorency as Sandra
 Amulette Garneau as Bec de lièvre
 Denis Drouin as Maurice
 Jean Archambault as Hosanna
 Gilles Renaud as Cuirette
 Claude Gai as la Duchesse de Langeais
 Manda Parent as Germaine Lauzon
 Béatrice Picard as Robertine
 Rita Lafontaine as Manon
 Mireille Rochon as Linda Lauzon
 Johnny Pothitos as le P'tit

References

External links
 

1974 films
1974 drama films
Canadian drama films
Canadian LGBT-related films
1970s French-language films
Films directed by André Brassard
Films set in Montreal
Works by Michel Tremblay
French-language Canadian films
1970s Canadian films